Hibiscus noli-tangere is a species of flowering plant in the family Malvaceae. It is found only in Yemen.
Its natural habitat is subtropical or tropical dry forests. It is threatened by habitat loss.

Noli me tangere ('touch me not') is the Latin version of a phrase spoken, according to John 20:17, by Jesus to Mary Magdalene when she recognized him after his resurrection. The biblical scene gave birth to a long series of depictions in Christian art from Late Antiquity to the present. H. noli-tangere has sharp glass-like needles that detach from its leaves when touched.

References

noli-tangere
Endemic flora of Socotra
Endangered plants
Taxonomy articles created by Polbot